Waldo Water Tower may refer to:

Waldo Water Tower (Waldo, Arkansas), listed on the National Register of Historic Places in Columbia County, Arkansas
Waldo Water Tower (Kansas City, Missouri), listed on the National Register of Historic Places in Jackson County, Missouri